The Waterman Hémisphère is a pen introduced in 1994 by the French pen company, Waterman.

The Hémisphère is a light pen that has a cigar shaped barrel with a beveled top and usual Waterman clip. It comes in many colours (metallic, blue, green, red, cognac), a lacquer finish, or a brushed chrome or gold finish. The clip comes in chrome or 24-karat gold finish.

Images

References

Hemisphere